Leather Goddesses of Phobos 2: Gas Pump Girls Meet the Pulsating Inconvenience from Planet X! (also known as Leather Goddesses 2 or LGOP2) is a graphic adventure game written by Steve Meretzky and published by Activision in 1992 under the Infocom label. LGOP2 is the sequel to the 1986 interactive fiction game Leather Goddesses of Phobos, also written by Meretzky. LGOP2 featured full-screen graphics and a point-and-click interface instead of Infocom's text parser.

Gameplay
Whereas the original Leather Goddesses title was a text adventure, Leather Goddesses 2 adds detailed though somewhat cartoonish visuals to accompany your adventure. The game is played through a first-person window and features zero text input, instead using a point-and-click interface to interact with everything on screen. The player has the choice of playing through three different perspectives; Zeke the gas station owner, Barth the alien,  or Lydia, the daughter of the plot-important astronomer who discovers the namesake planet of the game's title, "Planet X". Also featured are lots of branching dialogues, and optional interactions.

Whereas the original Leather Goddesses game offered three "naughtiness levels", the sequel has no such settings. The box did, however, feature "warnings" such as "Mature Attitudes Expressed".

Plot

In the original Leather Goddesses of Phobos, the titular female aliens suffered a humiliating defeat in 1936 at the hands of an Earthling from Ohio. Now it is 1958, and astronomers have recently discovered "Planet X", the tenth planet in our solar system. The desert town of Atom City, Nevada does not contain much besides a military base, nuclear power plant and gas station. But one night the sleepy town witnesses a spaceship that crash-lands with a single survivor: Barth, the "Pulsating Inconvenience" from the world known as Planet X.

The Leather Goddesses have invaded Planet X and forced its inhabitants to become sex slaves. Barth has fled to Earth in a desperate effort to find humans who can help free his planet. The player can play as any of three characters: Barth (the alien), Zeke (the gas station owner), or Lydia (daughter of the astronomer who "discovered" Planet X). In an effort to further link this game to the original, Zeke was the son of the male protagonist from LGOP.

Reception

GamersHell gave Leather Goddesses 2 a somewhat favorable review, stating "Whenever you speed to a character you have a large picture of him/her on your right side, and they all look very detailed. It really makes it look like Infocom/Activision made an effort into making this game. At least on the graphic side."

Computer Gaming World gave the game an unfavorable review, stating that it "seems to lose the entire spirit of the original text game in the 'translation' to graphic adventure". The magazine criticized the interface and puzzles as oversimplified, the poor quality of the voice dialogue, and the "insipid" treatment of sex compared to the "silly [but] mature" approach in the predecessor. It advised readers to purchase the older game while "waiting for someone to produce an interesting 'adult' adventure".

References

External links

1992 video games
Adventure games
Amiga games
DOS games
Erotic video games
Infocom games
Activision games
Classic Mac OS games
Fiction set on Phobos (moon)
Single-player video games
Science fiction video games
ScummVM-supported games
Steve Meretzky games
Video game sequels
Video games scored by Russell Lieblich
Video games featuring female protagonists
Video games set in Nevada
Video games developed in the United States